Little Racers is a racing game by Spanish developer Milkstone Studios for the Xbox 360 published in 2011. In February 2014, it was released for the Microsoft Windows, OS X, and Linux, as Little Racers STREET.

Gameplay
The main gameplay mechanics of Little Racers are similar to other Top-down Racing games such as Super Sprint, Indy Heat and Super Off Road.

References

External links
 
 Little Racers at Xbox.com

2011 video games
Linux games
MacOS games
Multiplayer and single-player video games
Top-down racing video games
Video games developed in Spain
Windows games
Xbox 360 games